Wolf of the Battlefield: Commando 3 is a 2008 downloadable game developed by Backbone Entertainment for the Xbox 360 and PlayStation 3. It is the second sequel to Capcom's Commando arcade game, following Mercs; "Wolf of the Battlefield" is a translation of the series' original title (Senjō no Ōkami).

Gameplay

Development

Reception 

The game received "average" reviews on both platforms according to the review aggregation website Metacritic. TeamXbox said, "Commando 3 definitely has its appeal, but a lot more could have been done to extend the gameplay or just make it feel more varied."  Official Xbox Magazine said, "This three-player scrolling shooter has that old-school, spray-and-slay mojo that your inner rageaholic craves."

References

External links 
 

2008 video games
Capcom games
Xbox 360 Live Arcade games
PlayStation Network games
Video games developed in the United States
Video games featuring female protagonists
Video games scored by Takahiro Izutani
Run and gun games